Pascal Bongard is a Swiss film actor. He has appeared in more than forty films since 1984.

Selected filmography

References

External links
 
 

Living people
Swiss male film actors
Swiss male television actors
21st-century Swiss male actors
Year of birth missing (living people)